Hibbertia pachynemidium is a species of flowering plant in the family Dilleniaceae and is endemic to southern New South Wales. It is a small, mat-forming shrub with oblong to lance-shaped or elliptic leaves and yellow flowers with eight to seventeen stamens arranged around three carpels.

Description 

Taxonomy 
Hibbertia pachynemidium was first formally described in 2013 by Hellmut R. Toelken in the Journal of the Adelaide Botanic Gardens from specimens collected by Roy Pullen on Big Badja Mountain in 1973. The specific epithet (pachynemidium) is the diminutive form of Greek words meaning "broad thread", and refers to the thickened stamen filaments.

Distribution and habitat 
This hibbertia grows in eucalypt woodland on the Southern Tablelands of New South Wales.

See also 
 List of Hibbertia species

References 

pachynemidium
Flora of New South Wales
Plants described in 2013
Taxa named by Hellmut R. Toelken